Nowa Wieś  is a village in the administrative district of Gmina Kuczbork-Osada, within Żuromin County, Masovian Voivodeship, in east-central Poland.

The village has a population of 300.

References

Villages in Żuromin County